Sława (German: Schlawa, 1937–45: Schlesiersee) is a town in Wschowa County, Lubusz Voivodeship, Poland, with 4,321 inhabitants (2019).

History
The area was part of Poland after the creation of the state in the 10th century. Later on, as a result of the fragmentation of Poland, it was part of the Polish Piast-ruled Duchy of Głogów until 1468. The town was mentioned in a document from 1312.

Between 1871 and 1945 the town was part of Germany and was renamed Schlesiersee in 1937 during the Nazi campaign of erasing placenames of Polish origin. The original Polish name Sława was restored after Nazi Germany's defeat in World War II, when the town once again became part of Poland.

Twin towns – sister cities
See twin towns of Gmina Sława.

Gallery

See also

 Slawa Duldig (1901–1975), Austrian-Australian inventor, artist, interior designer and teacher

References

Cities and towns in Lubusz Voivodeship
Wschowa County